Naaginn - Waadon Ki Agniparikshaa is a Hindi television series that aired on Zee TV from 5 October 2007 till 11 April 2009.  The show was produced by AK Films.

Plot
The show is based on a tale of an ichchhadhari naagin (a female snake who can change form at will) named Amrita. She transforms herself into a woman to take revenge from the Singh family, which had killed her parents (king and queen of the Naag or snake community) to get the valuable Naagmani (snake gem).

While dying, the queen naaginn instructs Amrita to take revenge from the killers and get back the naagmani in their community so that she can give back life to her parents. In order to fulfill the wish of her dying naagin mother, Amrita transforms herself into a human being to take revenge. And then she gets married into the same family whose members had killed her parents. But the dilemma is that her duty as a wife and her love towards her human husband Arjun comes in the way of her revenge. After a lot of turmoil in her life, Amrita gets pregnant. However, in protecting Amrita and the unborn babies, her husband Arjun dies. All the Singh family members die, except for Arjun's grandmother Triveni. Amrita gives birth to identical twins. Triveni and Surmaya come and kill Amrita with the deadly poison, Vasuki. However, another ichhadhari snake, Kanishka, helps Amrita who wants to live for her daughters. He advises her to become a ghostly spirit so she can watch over her children. However, she will not be able to touch them and they will not be able to see her. Amrita agrees. Amrita's two daughters are about seven years old and they will look exactly like Amrita when they grow up. One daughter is with Triveni, who treats her miserably, and the other daughter is with a village woman, who soon dies. Triveni goes to the sorcerer Bhairavnath who helps her in trying to bring Amrita to the human world so she can be finished off forever. Season 1 ends with Amrita's ghost being captured.

Cast
 Sayantani Ghosh as Amrita Arjun Singh / Shivali Singh / Sanchi Singh (Ichchhadhari naagin)
 Khushi Dubey as young Amrita / Shivali Singh / Sanchi Singh (Amrita's Twin Daughters)
 Sachin Shroff as Arjun Singh 
 Manav Gohil as Naagraj
 Preeti Puri as Naagrani
 Divya Dwivedi as Vishakha
 Aruna Irani as Triveni Singh (Maa Sa)
 Ali Hassan as Rudra Singh
 Siddharth Dhawan as Vishnu Singh
 Shahbaz Khan as Bhairavnath
 Lata Sabharwal / Niyati Joshi as Ratna Vishnu Singh 
 Namrata Thapa as Archana Rudra Singh 
 Jaskaran Singh Gandhi as Dev
 Amar Upadhyay as Vishal
 Eijaz Khan as Ranveer
 Shaleen Bhanot / Manoj Bidwai as Kanishk / Keshav
 Sonia Singh as Kanak Singh 
 Mayank Anand as Vikram Singh
 Jividha Sharma as Saroj Vikram Singh
 Adi Irani as Kaka Sa
 Manini Mishra as Ambalika
 Sachin Verma as Karan Singh
 Aanchal Dwivedi as Sneha Karan Singh (Karan's Wife)
 Shweta Tiwari as Queen Surmaya
 Gajendra Chauhan as Naagdev
 Mehul Kajaria as Vishesh
 Rakshanda Khan as Mayuri
 Sudha Chandran as Maa Pravanchikha
 Sulakshana Khatri as Katyani
 Dincy Vira as Pari
 Jaya Binju as Majharika
 Puneet Sachdev as Pawan
 Sailesh Gulabani as Agni
 Chhavi Mittal as Aastha
 Karishma Randhawa as Urja
 Supriya Pathak as Sudha
 Kiran Kumar as Mr. Singh, Triveni's husband (only in photoframe)
 Shalini Sahuta as Mohini
 Unknown as Bhujang

Remake

References

External links
Official Website

2007 Indian television series debuts
2009 Indian television series endings
Indian fantasy television series
Indian television soap operas
Zee TV original programming
Television series about shapeshifting
Television series about snakes